The Iloilo Football Association is a Filipino football association based in Iloilo City. It works under the Philippine Football Federation as provincial football association for the Iloilo province area. The Iloilo FA sends a team to represent the region in the yearly PFF National Men's Club Championship. Most of competitions formed by the association is played in the 10,000 capacity Iloilo Sports Complex.

Most successful teams and players comes from Barotac Nuevo, 27 km north of the city. The town counts Chieffy Caligdong as one of its product. Sta. Barbara and La Paz likewise develops skilled players who played in the national level.

Stallion FC, a club that plays in the United Football League is affiliated with the IFA.

Philippine Air Force FC, an association football club that plays in the UFL has players coming from Iloilo and play for the IFA when called up.

Iloilo hosted the PFF Smart Club Championship-Group B on August 9–13 of 2011 which was facilitated by IFA wherein the games were played at the Barotac Nuevo Football Field and Central Philippine University.

Mariano Araneta Jr, the current Philippine Football Federation is the former president of IFA.

References

Football governing bodies in the Philippines
Sports in Iloilo